Semiotics: Yearbook of the Semiotic Society of America is an annual series that publishes a selection of the peer-reviewed papers presented at the society's annual conference. The content and thematic focus of each volume varies based on the program of the annual meeting.

The Semiotic Society of America is an interdisciplinary professional association that supports the study of signs and sign-systems. In addition to this series the society also publishes The American Journal of Semiotics. All volumes of both publications are available online from the Philosophy Documentation Center.

References

External links 
 
 Semiotic Society of America
 Legas Publishing
 Philosophy Documentation Center
 Journals of semiotics in the world

Publications established in 1980
Semiotics journals